Henepola is a Sri Lankan village within Central Province.

See also
List of towns in Central Province, Sri Lanka

External links

Populated places in Central Province, Sri Lanka